Sophia Sidney, Baroness De L'Isle and Dudley (née FitzClarence; August 1796 – 10 April 1837) was the eldest illegitimate daughter of William IV of the United Kingdom and his longtime mistress Dorothea Jordan. She was married to Philip Sidney, 1st Baron De L'Isle and Dudley, and had four surviving children. Shortly before her death in 1837, she served as State Housekeeper in Kensington Palace.

Family and early life
Sophia FitzClarence was born in August 1796 on Somerset Street in London, the eldest daughter of Prince William, Duke of Clarence and St Andrews, by his longtime mistress, the comic actress Dorothea Jordan. Sophia would come to have nine siblings, five brothers and four sisters all surnamed FitzClarence. While circumstances prevented the couple from ever marrying, for twenty years William and Dorothea enjoyed domestic stability and were devoted to their children. In 1797, they moved from Clarence Lodge to Bushy House, residing at the Teddington residence until 1807. The couple separated in 1811 as William sought to produce legitimate issue.

Marriage and issue
On 13 August 1825, she married Philip Sidney, later an M.P. and the 1st Baron De L'Isle and Dudley of Penshurst in the County of Kent. Sidney was a relation of the Romantic poet and philosopher Percy Bysshe Shelley, though he opted to drop "Shelley" from his surname.

Sophia and her husband had four surviving children, three daughters and a son:

 Adelaide Augusta Wilhelmina Sidney, married her first cousin, Frederick Charles George FitzClarence-Hunloke, son of George FitzClarence, 1st Earl of Munster, no issue
 Ernestine Wellington Sidney, married Philip Perceval; mother of Major Sir Philip Hunloke, who was the father of Lt.-Col. Henry Philip Hunloke
 Sophia Philippa Sidney, married Alexander, Graf von Kielmannsegg, a great-grandson of Johann Ludwig, Reichsgraf von Wallmoden-Gimborn (alleged illegitimate son of George II of Great Britain)
 Philip Sidney, 2nd Baron De L'Isle and Dudley of Penshurst (1828–1898), grandfather of the 1st Viscount De L'Isle

Later life

In May 1831 Sophia, like her sisters, was raised to the status of a daughter of a marquess. In January 1837, she was appointed State Housekeeper of Kensington Palace, where she died three months later. Sophia died in childbirth just after drawing a sketch of her ailing father. She was his favourite child and her death caused him intense grief, exacerbated by the fact that he was completely estranged from her brother the Earl of Munster. She was remembered as a woman of great wit, charm and gaiety. There is a memorial to her at St John the Baptist, Penshurst.

The widowed Sidney died in 1851.

Ancestry

References

Works cited

 
 
 
 
 

 

1795 births
1837 deaths
18th-century British people
19th-century British people
18th-century British women
19th-century British women
De L'Isle and Dudley
Deaths in childbirth
FitzClarence family
Illegitimate children of William IV of the United Kingdom
Shelley family
Daughters of kings